Amelichloa is a genus of flowering plants belonging to the family Poaceae.

Its native range stretches from Mexico into southern South America. It is found in (southern, north eastern and northwestern) Argentina, Chile, (most of) Mexico and Uruguay. 

The genus was circumscribed by Mirta O. Arriaga and Mary Elizabeth Barkworth in Sida vol.22 on page 146 in 2006.

The genus name of Amelichloa is in honour of María Amelia Torres (1934–2011), who was an Argentinian botanist, lecturer and curator of the Herbarium of the National University of La Plata.

Species
As accepted by Kew:
Amelichloa ambigua 
Amelichloa brachychaeta 
Amelichloa brevipes 
Amelichloa caudata 
Amelichloa clandestina

References

Poaceae
Poaceae genera
Flora of Mexico
Flora of southern South America